Luiz Philippe of Orléans-Braganza (born 3 April 1969) is a Brazilian politician, activist, businessman, and member of the former ruling House of Orléans-Braganza. He was elected Federal Deputy for São Paulo in the 2018 Brazilian elections for the Social Liberal Party with 118,457 votes.

Biography
Luiz Philippe was born in Rio de Janeiro in 1969, the son of Eudes of Orléans-Braganza and Ana Maria de Moraes Barros. Luiz Philippe is the grandson of Pedro Henrique of Orléans-Braganza.

Luiz Philippe studied business at Fundação Armando Álvares Penteado (FAAP) and in 1993 received a master's degree in political science from Stanford University. In 1997 he received an MBA from INSEAD.

Professional life 
The professional trajectory of Luiz Philippe began in the United States, where he worked in companies of the financial market. Luiz Philippe was part of the financial planning of Saint-Gobain, a French multinational, between 1993 and 1996. He then worked for three years at the JP Morgan investment bank in London and the investment bank at Lazard Frères in New York City. From 2000, he returned to Brazil as director of business development for America Online (AOL) in Latin America. In 2005 he became an entrepreneur, when he founded the company IKAT do Brasil, which operates in the field of motorcycle parts distribution. In 2012 Luiz Philippe founded ZAP Tech, an incubator of means of payment for mobile platforms.

He backed the Donald Trump social media venture, Truth Social, by becoming the chief financial officer of its special-purpose acquisition company, Digital World Acquisition Corp (DWAC)

Political activism 
Luiz Philippe founded the liberal movement "Acorda Brasil" (Wake up Brazil) in 2014. The following year, during the impeachment process of former President Dilma Rousseff, he presented a political reform bill to the Chamber of Deputies in Brasilia. He participated in the development and intermediation with the Federal Senate, in 2016, of a Constitutional Amendment Project (PEC) that allows the non-confidence vote of a president. Luiz Philippe also participates in the Canal Terça Livre with the Caia na Real program, and travels Brazil with the lecture Redefinindo o Brasil.

He was elected Federal Deputy for the Social Liberal Party (PSL) when competing for the state of São Paulo, being the 33rd most voted in the state. He came close to competing for the Vice-Presidency of Brazil on the slate of the candidate Jair Bolsonaro, from the same party.

Among his proposals is a presidential veto, inversion of the state's public spending pyramid, and the creation of a new constitution along the lines of the Brazilian Constitution of 1824 (written at a time when the monarchy was the form of government).

Publications

Ancestry

References

External links

1969 births
Living people
Brazilian Roman Catholics
Brazilian political scientists
Brazilian anti-communists
Brazilian monarchists
Stanford University alumni
Conservatism in Brazil
Social Liberal Party (Brazil) politicians
New Party (Brazil) politicians
Luiz Philippe
Brazil Union politicians
Liberal Party (Brazil, 2006) politicians